The island territories of the Netherlands Antilles were the top-level administrative subdivisions of the Netherlands Antilles. The government of each island territory consisted of three major parts:

 The island council – the local parliament, elected every four years.
 The executive council – the executive board of the island territory, comparable to the Dutch provincial executive and municipal executive.
 The lieutenant governor – chair of the island council and executive council, appointed by the Crown for a six-year term.

List of island territories

See also 
 Islands Regulation of the Netherlands Antilles
 Caribbean Netherlands
 Dutch Caribbean

References 

Netherlands Antilles
Netherlands Antilles
Government of the Netherlands Antilles
 
Geography of the Netherlands Antilles